The equatorial akalat (Sheppardia aequatorialis) is a species of bird in the family Muscicapidae.
Its natural habitat is subtropical or tropical moist montane forests.

Subspecies
 S. a. acholiensis : Imatong Mountains
 S. a. aequatorialis : eastern DRC, southern Uganda, Rwanda, Burundi and western Kenya.

References

equatorial akalat
Birds of Sub-Saharan Africa
equatorial akalat
Taxonomy articles created by Polbot